The lieutenant governor of South Dakota is the second-ranking member of the executive branch of South Dakota state government and also serves as presiding officer of the South Dakota Senate. The lieutenant governor succeeds to the officer of governor if the office becomes vacant, and may also serve as acting governor if the governor is incapacitated or absent from the state.

Since 1974, the lieutenant governor has been elected on a ticket with the governor. Seven lieutenant governors have gone on to be elected governor in their own right: Charles N. Herreid (1900 & 1902), Frank M. Byrne (1912 & 1914), Peter Norbeck (1916 & 1918), William H. McMaster (1920 & 1922), Carl Gunderson (1924), Nils Boe (1964 & 1966) and Dennis Daugaard (2010 & 2014). Two others, Harvey L. Wollman and Walter Dale Miller, succeeded to the office of governor, but neither won election to a full term.

List of lieutenant governors

Parties

See also
 Lieutenant governor (United States) (generally)

Notes